Nuorunen is a peak in the Republic of Karelia, Russia. It is the highest point of the Federal Subject.

The peak is located in the Paanajärvi National Park, a  protected area.

Description
The mountain rises in the northwestern sector of the Loukhsky District, east of the Finnish border. The top of the mountain is barren, offering a clear panorama of the surrounding area. There is a very large boulder on the top, allegedly a sieidi.

See also
 List of highest points of Russian federal subjects
 List of mountains and hills of Russia

References

External links

Hiking trail to Mt. Nuorunen

Loukhsky District
Nuorunen
Landforms of the Republic of Karelia